The Kobe Bell (also known as the Friendship Bell) is installed in the Seattle Center in Seattle, Washington, United States. The bell is recognized as a Seattle Historic Site.

References

External links 
 

Individual bells in the United States
Japanese-American culture in Seattle
Seattle Center
Outdoor sculptures in Seattle